Lieutenant-Colonel Robert Peel Dawson Spencer Chichester, DL, JP (13 August 1873 – 10 December 1921) was an Irish soldier and politician.

Background and family
Chichester was the son of Lord Adolphus John Spencer Churchill Chichester (18 December 1836 – 5 March 1901, a son of the 4th Marquess of Donegall) and his wife Mary Chichester (née Dawson, died 1924).

Robert Chichester married Dehra Kerr-Fisher, later member of the Northern Ireland Parliament for Londonderry and South Londonderry. They had a son and a daughter; their son predeceased them: 
 Robert James Spencer Chichester (1902–1920)
 Marion Caroline Dehra Chichester (1904–1976); her children included Prime Minister of Northern Ireland James Chichester-Clark, Baron Moyola, and Sir Robin Chichester-Clark

Career
Chichester served in the British Central Africa Campaign (1897–1900), and was commissioned in the Irish Guards in August 1900. He was promoted to lieutenant 1 January 1901, and fought in the Boer War. On 22 January 1902 he was promoted to captain, and he was later promoted to major in the Irish Guards. He gained the rank of Lieutenant-Colonel in the service of the Royal Irish Rifles. He held the office of High Sheriff of County Londonderry for 1907 and was appointed High Sheriff of Antrim for 1911.

He was Justice of the Peace (JP) for Counties Donegal, Antrim and  Londonderry. He held the office of Deputy Lieutenant (DL) of Counties Donegal, Antrim and Londonderry. He lived at Moyola Park, Castledawson, County Londonderry. He was briefly a Member of Parliament at Westminster for South Londonderry: his son-in-law, wife and a grandson were later members for South Londonderry in the Northern Ireland parliament and another grandson for Londonderry at Westminster.

See also
List of United Kingdom MPs with the shortest service

References

External links
Profile, thepeerage.com; accessed 7 June 2017. 
 

1873 births
1921 deaths
Deputy Lieutenants of Donegal
Deputy Lieutenants of Antrim
Deputy Lieutenants of Londonderry
High Sheriffs of Antrim
High Sheriffs of County Londonderry
Ulster Unionist Party members of the House of Commons of the United Kingdom
Irish Guards officers
British Army personnel of the Second Boer War
Royal Ulster Rifles officers
Robert
Members of the Parliament of the United Kingdom for County Londonderry constituencies (1801–1922)
UK MPs 1918–1922
Irish justices of the peace